Oswaldo Louzada (Rio de Janeiro, 12 April 1912 — Rio de Janeiro, 22 February 2008) was a Brazilian actor. He was also known as Louzadinha.

Louzada was born in Rio de Janeiro on April 12, 1912. He began working on the Radio Panamericana radio drama, under the direction of Oduvaldo Viana in 1944. Louzada also filmed two Brazilian movies in 1944, Gente Honesta and  É Proibido Sonhar.

Louzada did not begin working in television until 1971. His telenovela credits included Estúpido Cupido (Stupid Cupid), Locomotivas and Vamp. He also appeared in a number of miniseries, including Engraçadinha, O Primo Basílio and O Tempo e o Vento.

In 2003, Louzada was cast in the popular Brazilian telenovela, Mulheres Apaixonadas. He portrayed the elderly character, Leopoldo Duarte, who was married to Flora de Souza Duarte, played by fellow Brazilian actress Carmen Silva. The elderly couple in Mulheres Apaixonadas were often mistreated by their granddaughter, Dóris de Souza Duarte, who was portrayed by actress Regiane Alves.
 Louzada's role on Mulheres Apaixonadas earned him a good deal of fame throughout the country.

Oswaldo Louzada's last role in television was in the program, Sob Nova Direção. Louzada, who was a smoker, suffered from several chronic health problems during his final years, including hypertension, lung cancer and heart problems. He died at the Hospital Copa D'Or in Rio de Janeiro of multiple organ dysfunction syndrome on February 22, 2008, at the age of 95. He had been hospitalized for treatment since February 6, 2008. He was buried at the São João Batista Cemetery in Rio de Janeiro.

Actress Carmen Silva, who played Louzada's television wife on the Mulheres Apaixonadas telenovela, also died of multiple organ dysfunction syndrome, the same disorder which afflicted Louzada, two months later on April 21, 2008.

Partial filmography

1944: É Proibido Sonhar
1944: Gente Honesta
1948: Uma Luz na Estrada
1948: Inconfidência Mineira
1954: É Proibido Beijar
1955: Mãos Sangrentas .... Rat
1955: Leonora of the Seven Seas
1956: Rio Fantasia
1957: Rico Ri à Toa
1962: O Assalto ao Trem Pagador .... Miguel's tenant
1962: Esse Rio Que Eu Amo .... (segment "A Morte da Porta-Estandarte")
1963: Gimba, Presidente dos Valentes .... Gabiró
1964: Lampião, O Rei do Cangaço
1965: Viagem aos Seios de Duília
1965: Crônica da Cidade Amada .... (segment "A Morena e o Louro")
1970: Uma Garota em Maus Lençóis
1971: Bandeira 2 (TV Series) .... Lupa Papa-Defunto
1974: Guerra Conjugal .... João Corno
1975: Escalada (TV Series) .... Galbino
1976: Estúpido Cupido (TV Series) .... Guimarães
1977: Locomotivas (TV Series) .... Chico Rico
1978: Pecado Rasgado (TV Series) .... Bilu
1979: Cabocla (TV Series) .... Felício
1981: Brilhante (TV Series) .... Leonel
1982: Final Feliz (TV Series) .... Olegário
1983: Champagne (TV Series) .... Aristides
1985: O Tempo e o Vento (TV Series) .... Florêncio (the old one)
1986: Hipertensão (TV Series) .... priest Vicente
1988: O Primo Basílio (TV Mini-Series) .... Cunha Rosado
1989: Pacto de Sangue (TV Series) .... General Tóti
1990: Desejo (TV Mini-Series) .... Erico Coelho
1991: Vamp (TV Series) .... priest Eusébio
1995: Cara e Coroa (TV Series) .... priest (special guest)
1995: Engraçadinha... Seus Amores e Seus Pecados (TV Mini-Series)
1996: A Casa de Açúcar
2000: Uga-Uga (TV Series) .... Moretti
2002: O Quinto dos Infernos (TV Mini-Series) .... Alencastro
2003: Mulheres Apaixonadas (TV Series) .... Leopoldo de Sousa Duarte
2003: Zorra Total (TV Series)

References

External links
 

1912 births
2008 deaths
Brazilian male radio actors
Brazilian male television actors
Brazilian male telenovela actors
Brazilian male voice actors
Brazilian male film actors
Male actors from Rio de Janeiro (city)
Deaths from multiple organ failure